Zachary Beare Conine (born October 20, 1981) is an American attorney, businessman and politician from the U.S. state of Nevada. He is currently the Nevada State Treasurer.

Biography
Conine was raised in New York. He graduated from Cornell University in 2003 and then moved to Nevada. He worked in Bullhead City, Arizona, and Laughlin, Nevada, and opened his own business consulting company in Las Vegas in 2014.

Conine ran for the District 34 seat in the Nevada Assembly in the 2016 elections, but lost in the Democratic Party primary election to Shannon Bilbray-Axelrod. In the 2018 elections, he ran for Nevada State Treasurer, and defeated Republican Bob Beers.

Following the Robb Elementary School shooting in 2022, Conine announced that Nevada would divest itself from $89 million in investments in firearms manufacturers.

Conine ran for reelection in 2022. He defeated Michele Fiore, the Republican nominee.

References

External links

Government website
Campaign website

1981 births
Cornell University alumni
Living people
Nevada Democrats
Politicians from Carson City, Nevada
Politicians from Las Vegas
State treasurers of Nevada
William S. Boyd School of Law alumni